SCH-202,596 is a natural product which is a metabolite derived from an Aspergillus fungus. It acts as a selective non-peptide antagonist for the receptor GAL-1, which is usually activated by the neuropeptide galanin. SCH-202,596 is used for scientific research into this still little characterised receptor subtype.

References 

Aspergillus
Halogen-containing natural products
Receptor antagonists
Cyclohexenes
Spiro compounds